Corticattus is a genus of Caribbean jumping spiders that was first described by J. X. Zhang & Wayne Paul Maddison in 2012.  it contains only two species, found only on Hispaniola and in Puerto Rico: C. guajataca and C. latus.

References

Salticidae genera
Salticidae
Spiders of the Caribbean